Slapy Reservoir (Czech: Vodní nádrž Slapy) is dam on the Vltava river in the Czech Republic, near to village Slapy. By area , it is the sixth biggest dam in the country. It was built as part of Vltava cascade between years 1949 and 1955. It has a hydroeletrics power station included.

References 

Dams in the Czech Republic
Hydroelectric power stations in the Czech Republic
Geography of the Central Bohemian Region
Benešov District
Prague-West District
Příbram District
Dams completed in 1955
Buildings and structures in the Central Bohemian Region
1955 establishments in Czechoslovakia
Reservoirs in the Czech Republic
20th-century architecture in the Czech Republic